Tala Monastery is a Buddhist monastery in Bhutan.

External links 
 Q Bhutan – Trekking and Walking

Buddhist monasteries in Bhutan
Tibetan Buddhist monasteries
Tibetan Buddhism in Bhutan